The 2016 Utah State Aggies football team represented Utah State University in the 2016 NCAA Division I FBS football season. The Aggies were led by fourth-year head coach Matt Wells and played their home games at Merlin Olsen Field at Maverik Stadium. This was Utah State's fourth season as members of the Mountain West Conference in the Mountain Division. They finished the season 3–9, 1–7 in Mountain West play to finish in last place in the Mountain Division.

Schedule

Schedule Source:

Game summaries

Weber State

at USC

Arkansas State

Air Force

at Boise State

at Colorado State

Fresno State

San Diego State

at Wyoming

New Mexico

at Nevada

at BYU

References

Utah State
Utah State Aggies football seasons
Utah State Aggies football